Jan Bedřich Kittl (8 May 1806 – 20 July 1868) was a Czech composer.

Biography
Kittl was born in Orlík. After studying law in Prague, Kittl studied music with Václav Tomášek. From 1843 to 1864, he headed the Prague Conservatory.

Kittl became famous for his operas, which have had great success in Prague. He also wrote chamber music, songs and four symphonies, including the widely played E-flat Symphony "Lovecka" (Jagdsinfonie Op. 8, 1838).

He died in Leszno, Poland on 20 July 1868, at the age of 62.

Operas
 Daphnis' Grave (lost)
 Bianca and Giuseppe (or the French before Nice), libretto by Richard Wagner based on Heinrich Koenig's novel The High Bride 1848
 Forest Flower, libretto by Johann Carl Hickel 1852
 The Iconoclast Libretto: Julius Edward Hartmann 1854

Songs
 "Glaubet nicht es wären Tränen" (text by Elise Schlick)

References

External links

 
 

1806 births
1868 deaths
People from Písek District
Czech composers
Czech male composers
Czech music educators
Academic staff of the Prague Conservatory
Pupils of Václav Tomášek
19th-century composers
19th-century Czech male musicians